WPLV (95.7 FM) is a radio station licensed to Navarre, Florida, United States, serving the Pensacola area. The station is owned by the Educational Media Foundation.

History
The station signed on in 2000 as WGCX with the contemporary Christian format it continues to broadcast. Before signing on, the station had the call signs WAFN, WZEW, and WGCX-FM.

In October 2013, 550 AM, Inc., sold WKFP to Educational Media Foundation for $1.75 million. The sale was consummated on December 23, 2013.

The station changed its call sign on July 21, 2015, to the current WPLV.

References

External links

K-Love radio stations
Radio stations established in 1999
1999 establishments in Florida
Educational Media Foundation radio stations
PLV